Operation Trumpsformation is a 2017 book by Irish journalist and author Paul Howard and is the seventeenth novel in the Ross O'Carroll-Kelly series.

The title refers to the TV series Operation Transformation and American President Donald Trump.

Background
Howard had nearly finished the book when Donald Trump won the 2016 United States presidential election; he felt he had to rewrite it to account for the state of the world: "I felt I couldn’t put out a book which didn’t reflect a Trump era."

Plot

Gay marriage is legalised in Ireland. Fionnuala, Ross's mother, is imprisoned, accused of the murder of her second husband. Ross's triplets develop an interest in soccer. Ross's father, Charles, aims to emulate Donald Trump and build a wall around Cork. Honor adopts a transgender identity, becoming "Eddie."

Reception
Emer McLysaght, writing in The Irish Times, said that "All of the Trump comparisons and the very 2017 “woke” topics might initially seem a little clumsy and shoehorned in, but what Howard and O’Carroll-Kelly have once again managed to do is provide hilarious satire, enjoyably transparent commentary on political happenings at home and abroad, and masterful phonetic conversations across Ross’s own south Dublin circle."

In Hot Press, Siobhán Hegarty said that "Howard's latest satirical offering sparkles throughout and is funnier than ever."

Tara Flynn recommended it for one of her Christmas reads.

Operation Trumpsformation was nominated for the Specsavers Popular Fiction Book of the Year at the 2017 Irish Book Awards.

It sold over 17,000 copies in 2017, being the tenth-bestselling book in Ireland for that year's Christmas.

References

2017 Irish novels
Penguin Books books
Ross O'Carroll-Kelly
Donald Trump in popular culture
Fiction set in 2015
Fiction set in 2016